The 2013–14 Liga Nacional de Fútbol de Guatemala season was the 15th season in which the Apertura and Clausura season is used. The season began on 4 August 2013 and will end in May 2014.

Format
The format for both championships are identical. Each championship will have two stages: a first stage and a playoff stage. The first stage of each championship is a double round-robin format. The teams that finish first and second in the standings will advance to the playoffs semifinals, while the teams that finish 3–6 will enter in the quarterfinals. The winner of each quarterfinal will advance to the semifinals. The winners of the semifinals will advance to the finals, which will determine the tournament champion.

Teams

Torneo Apertura
The 2013 Torneo Apertura began on 4 August 2013 and will end in December 2013.

Standings

Results

Playoffs

Quarterfinals

First Leg

Second Leg

Semifinals

First Leg

Second Leg

Finals

First Leg

Second Leg

Torneo Clausura
The 2014 Torneo Clausura began on 18 January 2014 and will end in May 2014.

Personnel and sponsoring

Standings

Results

Playoffs

Aggregate table

References

Liga Nacional de Fútbol de Guatemala seasons
1
Guatemala